Mert Akay (born 12 July 2000) is a Turkish professional basketball player for Dynamic Belgrade of the Basketball League of Serbia.

Professional career
Akay grew up with the youth system of Darüşşafaka. In the 2018–19 season, he became a regular member of Darüşşafaka's senior team. On 25 January 2019, Akay made his EuroLeague debut for Darüşşafaka against Kirolbet Baskonia making his only three-point attempt in under 2 minutes of playing time.

On 10 October 2019, Akay signed a contract with the Serbian team Dynamic Belgrade. Following the 2020–21 season Akay declared for the 2021 NBA draft. On July 19, 2021, he withdrawn his name from consideration for the 2021 NBA draft.

National team career 
Akay was a member of the Turkey U16 national team that won the bronze medal at the 2016 FIBA U16 European Championship in Radom, Poland. Over seven tournament games, he averaged 2.3 points, 1.6 rebounds, and 1.9 assists per game.

Career statistics

EuroLeague

|-
| style="text-align:left;"| 2018–19
| style="text-align:left;"| Darüşşafaka
| 7 || 1 || 11.0 || .412 || .250 || .556 || 1.1 || 1.6 || .4 || .0 || 3.0 || 1.3

References

External links
 Mert Akay at euroleague.net
 Mert Akay at aba-liga.com

2000 births
Living people
Basketball League of Serbia players
Darüşşafaka Basketbol players
KK Dynamic players
People from Beyoğlu
Basketball players from Istanbul
Point guards
Turkish expatriate basketball people in Serbia
Turkish men's basketball players